Qeshlaq-e Damirchluy-e Qarah Qeshlaq-e Hajj Majid (also Romanized as Qeshlāq-e Damīrchlūy-e Qarah Qeshlāq-e Ḩājj Majīd; also known as Damīrchīlū-ye Qeshlāq-e Ḩājj Majīd) is a village in Qeshlaq-e Jonubi Rural District, Qeshlaq Dasht District, Bileh Savar County, Ardabil Province, Iran. At the 2006 census, its population was 16, in 5 families.

References 

Towns and villages in Bileh Savar County